Cruz Miguel Bustamante (born January 4, 1953) is an American politician. He previously served as the 45th Lieutenant Governor of California from 1999 to 2007, serving under governors Gray Davis and Arnold Schwarzenegger. A member of the Democratic Party, Bustamante also served in the California State Assembly and served as the Speaker from 1996 to 1998.

Early life and education
The eldest of six children, Cruz Bustamante was born in Dinuba, California. His family later moved to San Joaquin, California. He attended and graduated from Tranquillity High School in the 1970s, where he excelled in both football and wrestling, and later attended Fresno City College and California State University, Fresno. Bustamante earned his Bachelor of Arts via distance learning from California State University, Fresno in 2003.

Career

As a resident of Fresno, Bustamante was elected to the California State Assembly in a special election in 1993, and became the Speaker of the Assembly in 1996. He was elected lieutenant governor in 1998, the first Latino elected to statewide office in California in more than 120 years. He was also the highest-ranking elected Latino officeholder in the United States until Bill Richardson became governor of New Mexico in 2003.

2003 recall election
He was the most prominent Democrat to run in the 2003 California recall election to remove Governor Gray Davis, and placed second to Republican Arnold Schwarzenegger, losing by 17 points. (see full election results).

Bustamante had an apparently icy relationship with Governor Davis, a fellow Democrat, during his tenure. They reportedly had not talked in months before the recall election approached. Bustamante's decision to run in the recall election was controversial, as many supporters of Governor Davis had urged prominent Democrats not to run, in an attempt to undermine the legitimacy of the event. During the recall election, Bustamante ran on a platform slogan of "No on Recall, Yes on Bustamante," indicating he opposed the recall.

2006 insurance commissioner election

Bustamante was the Democratic nominee for California insurance commissioner in 2006. In his official candidate statement, he said "I want to become an example to others to lead healthier lives by losing weight myself. Obesity in California costs $7.7 billion a year." Bustamante claimed to have shed 43 pounds, to a weight of 235 pounds, by means of diet and exercise.

He easily won the June 6, 2006 Democratic primary, receiving 70.5% of the vote and defeating his challenger, John Kraft. Bustamante received 1,606,913 votes to 674,309 for Kraft. Many political analysts believed that Kraft, who ran a low-key campaign where he took no campaign contributions, received those votes as a protest for Bustamante's behavior during the 2003 recall election. However, Kraft planned to actively campaign for Bustamante in the general election, and donated a significant portion of his fortune as an heir to Kraft Foods to Bustamante's campaign.

Bustamante ran against Republican Steve Poizner in November. Bustamante announced that he would not be returning insurance industry contributions to his campaign, a position criticized by Poizner and campaign ethicists. Bustamante also failed to meet a deadline to submit a campaign statement to voters. According to the Field Poll, on November 3, 2006, Bustamante trailed Poizner by 9%. and lost to Poizner by 12% in the general election.

It was speculated that Bustamante would run for the U.S. House of Representatives in California's 21st congressional district in 2012, but ultimately he did not run.

Personal life 
With his wife Arcelia, Bustamante has three children.

Electoral history

See also 
 List of minority governors and lieutenant governors in the United States

References

External links

California June Primary Results
Cruz Bustamante on Manny Fernandez Internet Media Mogal

|-

|-

|-

|-

|-

1953 births
21st-century American politicians
Mexican-American people in California politics
Lieutenant Governors of California
Living people
People from Dinuba, California
People from Fresno, California
Speakers of the California State Assembly
Democratic Party members of the California State Assembly
Hispanic and Latino American state legislators in California